Nanling Township is a township in Lancang Lahu Autonomous County, Yunnan, China.

Administrative division
As of 2016, the township is divided into eight villages: 
Huanghui
Mangnong
Mengbing
Xiananxian
Qianzhe
Mangfu
Mengkan
Mali

History
In 1940, it belonged to the 4th District and then the Daling Township. 

After the founding of the Communist State in 1949, Nanling District was set up. During the Great Leap Forward, its name was changed to Wensheng Commune in 1969 and then Nanling Commune in 1971. It was incorporated as a township in 1988.

Geography
It lies at the central of Lancang Lahu Autonomous County, bordering Zhutang Township to the west, Menglang Town to the southwest, Nuozhadu Town to the south, Fubang Township and Donghe Township to the north, and Qianliu Yi Ethnic Township to the east.

There are major four rivers and streams in the township, namely the Mangnong River, Qianzhe River, Mengkan River, and the Black River.

Economy
The economy is supported primarily by farming, ranching and forestry. Economic crops are mainly peanut, tea, fruit, and bean.

Demographics

As of 2017, the National Bureau of Statistics of China estimates the township's population now to be 24,059.

References

Bibliography

Townships of Pu'er City
Divisions of Lancang Lahu Autonomous County